Kent Monroe Ferguson (born March 9, 1963) is a retired diver from the United States. He was born in Cedar Rapids, Iowa. Ferguson competed at the 1992 Summer Olympics, finishing in fifth place in the men's 3 m springboard event.

Ferguson won the gold medal in the same event a year earlier at the 1991 Pan American Games in Havana, Cuba, and at the 1991 World Aquatics Championships in Perth, Australia.

See also
 World Fit

References 
 

1963 births
Living people
American male divers
Divers at the 1992 Summer Olympics
Olympic divers of the United States
Sportspeople from Cedar Rapids, Iowa
World Aquatics Championships medalists in diving
Pan American Games gold medalists for the United States
Pan American Games medalists in diving
Divers at the 1991 Pan American Games
Medalists at the 1991 Pan American Games